Czech Lion Award for Best Design was an award given to the best design in Czech film.

Winners

External links

Czech Lion Awards
Awards established in 1993